North Fork Lake is an alpine lake in Custer County, Idaho, United States, located in the Boulder Mountains in Salmon-Challis National Forest. While no trails lead to the lake, it is most easily accessed from a trail from the end of forest road 128. The lake is located just northeast of Ryan Peak, the highest point in the Boulder Mountains.

References

Lakes of Idaho
Lakes of Custer County, Idaho
Glacial lakes of the United States
Salmon-Challis National Forest